Kevin Chelimo (born 14 February 1983) is a Kenyan long- and middle-distance runner.

Prep and College
Chelimo graduated from Tenges high school. Chelimo graduated from Tambach Teachers Training College and Texas Tech in 2006. Kevin finished 17th 2006 NCAA Division 1 cross country running championships, and 10th in 2007 NCAA Division 1 10,000 metres. Chelimo competed in national 3000 metres.

Coach
Texas Tech cross country All-American Kevin Chelimo, a volunteer assistant coach for Texas Tech Red Raiders from 2006 - 2008.

Personal
Kevin Chelimo married Sally Kipyego in 2008 summer.

Professional

Since 2008
Training in Eugene, Oregon with Oregon Track Club.

2012
Chelimo ran 2012 Payton Jordan Invitational in 13:14.57.

Chelimo competed in the 10,000 meters at the 2012 Kenyan Olympic Trials.

2015
Kevin's long buildup to NYC Marathon included:
Half Marathon 1:02:11 New York (USA) 15 March 2015
New York Road Runners 10 km in May 2015 29:19 6th place

Kevin Chelimo debuted at 1 November 2015 NYC Marathon in 2:15:49 in 10th place.

Personal Best
Marathon: 2:15:49
Half-Marathon: 1:01:21 
10000 m: 27:30.50 
5000 m: 13:14.57

References

External links

Kevin Chelimo All-Athletics
Player and coaching Bio at Texas Tech Athletics
Kevin Chelimo Twitter Profile
Kevin Chelimo Facebook Profile

1983 births
Living people
Kenyan male long-distance runners
Kenyan male middle-distance runners
Texas Tech Red Raiders men's track and field athletes
Texas Tech Red Raiders men's cross country runners
Texas Tech Red Raiders track and field coaches
Texas Tech Red Raiders cross country coaches